The Juche-class is a 4-part electric multiple unit built by the Kim Chong-t'ae Electric Locomotive Works in 1978, intended for service on the Korean State Railway.

Description

Electric railcars had been used in Korea before the war by the Kŭmgangsan Electric Railway, and these were used by Korean State Railway until the line was destroyed during the Korean War, and no further electric railcars were used after that for many years. However, the opening of the P'yŏngyang Metro in 1973, along with worldwide attention on high-speed electric trainsets such as the Japanese Shinkansen put into service in 1964 and the ER200 class introduced by the Soviet Railways in 1974, led the Railway Ministry to direct efforts towards the development of an electric multiple unit for North Korea, resulting in the unveiling of North Korea's first electric trainset, the Juche-class EMU, in 3 March 1978 at Kim Jong Thae as part of the 200 day campaign. Externally, the four-car set was similar in appearance to the 181 series trainsets used by the Japanese National Railways on the Kodama limited express of the day; internally, despite all of North Korea's electrification being 3000 V DC, the Juche-class EMU was built for two-system operation - possibly with a view to future operation in South Korea, where AC electrification was used.

The trainset was named 'Juche' by Kim Il-sung, in appreciation of the labour the workers of Kim Jong Thae locomotive works put into manufacturing it.

Operation
Trials were carried out around P'yŏngyang, but no further sets were built. The set was refurbished, repainted, and put into use on a daily commuter service for scientists between P'yŏngyang and Paesanjŏm in 1998, taking one hour to cover the  distance each way.

Philately 
The train was featured on a stamp issued on 30 April 1987.

References

Locomotives of North Korea
Kim Chong-tae Works locomotives
3000 V DC locomotives
25 kV AC locomotives
Railway locomotives introduced in 1976